The siege of Inverness may refer to:

Siege of Inverness (1429), part of the conflict between the Lord of the Isles and the Scottish crown
Siege of Inverness (1562), part of the Mary, Queen of Scots civil war
Siege of Inverness (1649), part of the Scottish civil war that formed part of the Wars of the Three Kingdoms
Siege of Inverness (1650), part of the Scottish civil war that formed part of the Wars of the Three Kingdoms
Siege of Inverness (1689), part of a feud between the Clan MacDonald of Keppoch and the city of Inverness
Siege of Inverness (1715), part of the 1715 Jacobite rising
Siege of Inverness (1746), part of the 1745 Jacobite rising